Lucius Veturius Philo (d. 210 BC) was a Roman statesman who served as consul in 220 BC, dictator in 217 BC (during the Second Punic War), and censor (magistrate in charge of the census and other matters) in 210 BC. Irregularities were found in his appointment as dictator and he resigned after fourteen days. He was a member of the gens Veturia.

He was the father of another Lucius Veturius Philo, who served as consul in 206 BC (and praetor peregrinus in 209, assigned the province of Gaul).

Philo died in 210 BC, while serving as censor, before he had the chance to enter the senate or "transact any public business whatsoever". The other censor, Publius Licinius Crassus, immediately resigned the censorship upon the death of his colleague.

References

Year of birth unknown
Year of death unknown
3rd-century BC Roman consuls
Ancient Roman dictators
Philo, Lucius
Roman censors
Roman patricians
Roman people of the Second Punic War